The 1969 Isle of Wight Festival was held on 29–31 August 1969 at Wootton Creek, on the Isle of Wight. The festival attracted an audience of approximately 150,000 to see acts including Bob Dylan, the Band, the Who, Free, Joe Cocker, the Bonzo Dog Band and the Moody Blues. It was the second of three music festivals held on the island between 1968 and 1970. Organised by Rikki Farr, Ronnie and Ray Foulk's Fiery Creations, it became a legendary event, largely owing to the participation of Dylan, who had spent the previous three years in semi-retirement. The event was well managed, in comparison to the recent Woodstock Festival, and trouble-free.

Bob Dylan
The 1969 festival was considerably larger and more popular than the previous year's. Dylan had been little heard of since his allegedly near-fatal motorcycle accident in July 1966. Shunning the Woodstock Festival, held near his home in upstate New York, Dylan was initially reluctant to perform his comeback show on the little-known Isle of Wight. After weeks of negotiations, the Foulk brothers showed him a short film of the island's cultural and literary heritage; this appealed to Dylan's artistic sensibilities, as he was enthusiastic about combining a family holiday with a live performance in Tennyson country. The family was scheduled to travel to Britain on the Queen Elizabeth II and nearly missed the gig because Dylan's son Jesse had been hit by a ship cabin door and needed to be hospitalised. Dylan travelled to the site by plane at the last minute.

Before the festival, Dylan and his fellow Woodstock residents, the Band, rehearsed at Forelands Farm in Bembridge, and were joined there by George Harrison, the only "outsider" to have visited him in his enclave in the Catskill Mountains. On Saturday, 30 August, the day before Dylan was to take the stage, Harrison's fellow Beatles John Lennon and Ringo Starr arrived on the island, along with Keith Richards of the Rolling Stones, and Eric Clapton. Also seated in the sealed-off VIP area in front of the stage would be Beatle wives Pattie Harrison, Yoko Ono and Maureen Starkey, together with celebrities such as Jane Fonda, Françoise Hardy, Georges Moustaki, Syd Barrett, Donald Cammell, Elton John and others.

Thanks to rumours that one or all of the Beatles would be joining him on stage, Dylan's comeback show had become, in the words of music journalist John Harris, "inflated into the gig of the decade". On 31 August, Dylan arrived on stage in a cream suit recalling Hank Williams. Backed by the Band, he performed recent pieces from his Nashville Skyline and John Wesley Harding albums, as well as countryfied versions of earlier songs such as "Maggie's Farm", "Highway 61 Revisited" and "Like a Rolling Stone".

Dylan's setlist was as follows:

 "She Belongs to Me"
 "I Threw It All Away"
 "Maggie's Farm"
 "Wild Mountain Thyme"
 "It Ain't Me, Babe"
 "To Ramona"
 "Mr. Tambourine Man"
 "I Dreamed I Saw St. Augustine"
 "Lay, Lady, Lay"
 "Highway 61 Revisited"
 "One Too Many Mornings"
 "I Pity the Poor Immigrant"
 "Like a Rolling Stone"
 "I'll Be Your Baby Tonight"
 "The Mighty Quinn (Quinn the Eskimo)"
 "Minstrel Boy"
 "Rainy Day Women #12 & 35"

Four performances from this concert were included on Dylan's album Self Portrait (1970): "Like a Rolling Stone", "The Mighty Quinn (Quinn the Eskimo)", "Minstrel Boy" and "She Belongs to Me". His set with the Band was also released in several countries on various bootleg records.

A champion of both the Band and Dylan, Harrison wrote a country song inspired by the event and dedicated to Dylan, "Behind That Locked Door", released on his 1970 triple album All Things Must Pass.

In 2013, the complete recording of Dylan's performance was released on the Deluxe Edition of The Bootleg Series Vol. 10: Another Self Portrait (1969–1971).

The Who
The Who presented their standard set at that time, which included the rock opera Tommy, as they had recently released that album and were touring in support of it. The group had just returned from a tour of the United States, where they had performed at Woodstock about two weeks earlier. They opened with "Heaven and Hell", followed by "I Can't Explain", "Fortune Teller", "Young Man Blues", and then performed the opera nearly in full, finishing up with "Summertime Blues", "Shakin' All Over"/"Spoonful" and two tracks as the encore: "My Generation" and the finale of "Naked Eye".

Line-up

 The Band
 Battered Ornaments 
 Blodwyn Pig
 Blonde on Blonde
 Bonzo Dog Doo-Dah Band
 Edgar Broughton Band
 Joe Cocker
 Aynsley Dunbar
 Bob Dylan
 Eclection
 Fat Mattress
 Family
 Gary Farr
 Julie Felix
 Free
 Gypsy
 Richie Havens
 Heaven
 Marsha Hunt & White Trash
 Indo Jazz Fusions
 King Crimson (billed, but did not appear)
 The Liverpool Scene
 Marsupilami 
 Mighty Baby 
 The Moody Blues
 The Nice
 Tom Paxton
 Pentangle
 The Pretty Things
 Third Ear Band
 The Who

References

External links

Isle of Wight Festival 1969
Ray Foulk interview on The History of the Isle of Wight Festival
Isle of Wight Festival History
Isle of Wight Festival
Early Isle Of Wight Festivals Forum – 1968–69–70
Memorabilia from the Original Isle of Wight Festivals 68-69-70

History of the Isle of Wight
1969
1969 in British music
1969 in England
20th century on the Isle of Wight
1969 music festivals
August 1969 events in the United Kingdom
Bob Dylan concert tours